The Pon Daw Pagoda (Burmese: ပုံတော်စေတီ) is a small pagoda in Mingun, Myanmar. Built in 1799, the temple is a miniature version of the larger, incomplete Mingun Pahtodawgyi, which was abandoned due to cost overruns. The Paw Daw Pagoda resembles what the Pahtodawgyi was intended to look like when it was complete.

References 

Tourist attractions in Myanmar
Buddhist temples in Myanmar
Buddhist pilgrimage sites in Myanmar
Buildings and structures in Sagaing Region